Donau Bank AG was a controlled bank in Vienna, Austria controlled by the Soviet Union and later, after the dissolution of the Soviet Union, by Russia.

It was acquired by Russian VTB Bank in 2000. In 2006 the name was changed to VTB Bank (Austria) AG. On December 29, 2017, VTB Group completed restructuring of its European operations. VTB Bank (Austria) AG, VTB Bank (Deutschland) AG und VTB Bank (France) SA, were merged into the newly created VTB Bank (Europe) SE (Frankfurt), which operates under a single banking license. Since that restructuring, VTB Bank (Europe) SE has the branch in Austria.

History
1974	 - Donau Bank AG is jointly founded in Vienna by the USSR State Bank and the USSR Foreign Trade Bank.
1992	 - The Central Bank of the Russian Federation acquires 99.97% of the bank, the remaining 0.03% is retained by the Foreign Trade Bank (Vneshtorgbank).
1997 - VTB acquires a 51% majority share in Donau Bank AG.
2005	 - VTB acquires 100% interest in Donau Bank AG.
2006 - In the context of VTB’s international rebranding program, Donau Bank AG is renamed VTB Bank (Austria) AG.
2007 - VTB Bank (Deutschland) AG and VTB Bank (France) SA are placed under VTB Bank (Austria) AG and together form a subgroup of the VTB Group.
2011 - Launch of VTB Direct Bank in Germany
2017 - 2018: VTB Bank (Austria) AG, VTB Bank (Deutschland) AG und VTB Bank (France) SA, were merged into the newly created VTB Bank (Europe) SE (Frankfurt), which operates under a single banking license. Since that restructuring, VTB Bank (Europe) SE has the branch in Austria.

Management Board 
Donau Bank AG (VTB Bank (Austria) AG) had the following management board members: 

 Valery P. Ipatoo
 Oleg M. Preksin
 Dkfm Otto Dracka
 Andrei Tchetyrkine
 Vladimir G. Malinin Chairman of the Board from December 1990 to April 1996
 Dr. Valeriy V. Lyakin
 Dr. Richard Vornberg (CEO)
 Christian Müllner
 Evgenij Minkin
 Igor Strehl (CEO)
 Alexey Krokhin (CEO)
 Simeon Nestorov
 Andrey Girichev (CEO)
 Andrey Skvortsov
 Mag. Damir Mehic
 Mag. Bernhard Schmidt
 Maria Minaeva
 Mark Airston
 Oxana Kozliouk

Notes

References

See also

 Foreign trade of the Soviet Union

Banks of Austria
Banks of the Soviet Union
Companies based in Vienna
Austria–Soviet Union relations